Pterolophia ochreomaculata is a species of beetle in the family Cerambycidae. It was discovered by Stephan von Breuning in 1940.

References

ochreomaculata
Beetles described in 1940